Jelow-e Olya (also Romanized as Jelow-e ‘Olyā) is a village in Sar Firuzabad Rural District, Firuzabad District, Kermanshah County, Kermanshah Province, Iran. In 2006, its population was 118, in 26 families.

References 

Populated places in Kermanshah County